Nqweba Dam (previously known as Van Ryneveld's Pass Dam), is an earth-fill type dam located on the Sundays River in the Camdeboo National Park, in Graaff-Reinet, Eastern Cape, South Africa.

It was opened in 1925. Once an irrigation dam, it now mainly serves to supply potable water for domestic and industrial use to the residents and businesses of Graaff-Reinet. Its hazard potential has been ranked high (3).

Etymology 
The new name given in 2001, means "meeting place" in Xhosa.

Gallery

See also
 List of reservoirs and dams in South Africa

References

 List of South African Dams from the Department of Water Affairs and Forestry (South Africa)

Dams in South Africa
Buildings and structures in the Eastern Cape
Dams completed in 1925